

Belgium
Belgian Congo – Pierre Ryckmans, Governor-General of the Belgian Congo (1934–1946)

France
 French Somaliland – 
 Pierre Marie Elie Louis Nouailhetas, Governor of French Somaliland (1940–1942)
 Christian Raimond Dupont, Governor of French Somaliland (1942)
 , Governor of French Somaliland (1942–1943)
 Guinea – 
 Antoine Félix Giacobbi, Governor of Guinea (1940–1942)
 Horace Valentin Crocicchia, Governor of Guinea (1942–1944)

Japan
 Karafuto – Masayoshi Ogawa, Governor-General of Karafuto (9 April 1940 – 1 July 1943)
 Korea – 
Jirō Minami, Governor-General of Korea (1936–1942)
Kuniaki Koiso, Governor-General of Korea (1942–1944)
 Taiwan – Kiyoshi Hasegawa, Governor-General of Taiwan (16 December 1940 – December 1944)

Portugal
 Angola – 
 Abel de Abreu Souto-Maior, High Commissioner of Angola (1941–1942)
 , High Commissioner of Angola (1942–1943)

United Kingdom
 Aden – Sir John Hathorn Hall, Governor of Aden (1940–1945)
 Malta Colony
William Dobbie, Governor of Malta (1940–1942)
Lord Gort, Governor of Malta (1942–1944)
 Northern Rhodesia – Sir Eubule John Waddington, Governor of Northern Rhodesia (1941–1947)

Colonial governors
Colonial governors
1942